Menard is a city in and the county seat of Menard County, Texas, United States. Its population was 1,471 at the 2010 census.

Geography

Menard is located at  (30.919519, –99.784446). It is situated along the banks of the San Saba River at the junction of U.S. Highways 83 and 190, about 140 miles northwest of Austin and San Antonio in central Menard County.

History

The first settlement at the site of what is now Menard was the Spanish Mission San Sabá and the Presidio of San Luís de Amarillas, both established in April 1757. The presidio was later replaced by the Presidio of San Sabá in 1761. Both were intended to protect New Spain's northern frontier from marauding Comanches. Due to the presidio's isolation, it suffered repeated attacks, and was finally abandoned in 1770. Stones from the old presidio walls were used by later settlers to build homes and fences. The ruins of the old presidio were reconstructed in 1936.

The community was first known as Menardville when the site was laid out in 1858, after the formation of Menard County. Nearby Fort McKavett was deactivated in 1859, leaving the settlers with little protection from frequent Indian raids. The fort reopened after the Civil War. By 1867, Menardville had a store, a blacksmith shop, and a saloon. The community served as a trading post and overnight stop on north and west cattle trails. A county government was organized in 1871 and a two-story courthouse was built one year later. Menardville had around 150 residents by the mid-1880s. The San Saba River flooded in 1899, causing considerable damage to the community.

In 1910 or 1911, while the Fort Worth and Rio Grande Company was making plans to lay a track through the community, company officials asked residents to rename their town Menard to facilitate the painting of signs. An economic boom followed the arrival of the first train in 1911. The 1920 census recorded 1,164 people living in Menard. For many years, the town served as the principal shipping point for Menard County. Although the community was affected by the Great Depression, both of its banks—the Menard National Bank and Bevans State Bank—remained open. Menard's population stood at 1,969 in 1930, 2,375 in 1940, and 2,685 in 1950. That figure began to decline during the 1950s and 1960s, as road improvements made travel and shipping less dependent on rail service. The Atchison, Topeka and Santa Fe Railroad discontinued its service to Menard in 1972, but donated the depot to the county for use as a history museum. The Menard County Historical Society began collecting artifacts in 1975 and dedicated the museum in 1978. By 1980, 1,697 people were living in Menard. In 1990, the population fell slightly to 1,606 before rebounding to 1,653 in 2000.

Demographics

2020 census

As of the 2020 United States census, there were 1,348 people, 735 households, and 356 families residing in the city.

2000 census
As of the census of 2000, 1,653 people, 666 households, and 438 families resided in the city. The population density was 803.5 people per square mile (309.8/km). There were 851 housing units at an average density of 413.6 per square mile (159.5/km). The racial makeup of the city was 84.94% White, 0.67% African American, 0.60% Native American, 0.36% Asian, 0.06% Pacific Islander, 11.98% from other races, and 1.39% from two or more races. Hispanics or Latinos of any race were 39.32% of the population.

Of the 666 households, 31.8% had children under the age of 18 living with them, 50.2% were married couples living together, 10.8% had a female householder with no husband present, and 34.1% were not families. About 31.4% of all households were made up of individuals, and 20.0% had someone living alone who was 65 years of age or older. The average household size was 2.42 and the average family size was 3.03.

In the city, the population was distributed as 27.2% under the age of 18, 6.0% from 18 to 24, 23.7% from 25 to 44, 22.6% from 45 to 64, and 20.6% who were 65 years of age or older. The median age was 40 years. For every 100 females, there were 97.3 males. For every 100 females age 18 and over, there were 87.5 males.

The median income for a household in the city was $19,698, and for a family was $27,125. Males had a median income of $21,094 versus $17,857 for females. The per capita income for the city was $12,768. About 26.5% of families and 33.1% of the population were below the poverty line, including 45.4% of those under age 18 and 28.2% of those age 65 or over.

Education
Public education in the City of Menard is provided by the Menard Independent School District and home to the Menard High School Yellow Jackets.

Attractions
Annual events in Menard include the Jim Bowie Trail Ride in September, the Saucedo family reunion, and the Silver Mine Classic Lamb Show in October.

Climate
The climate in this area is characterized by hot, humid summers and generally mild to cool winters.  According to the Köppen climate classification, Menard has a humid subtropical climate, Cfa on climate maps.

References

External links

 Menard County Chamber of Commerce
 Community Website

Cities in Texas
Cities in Menard County, Texas
County seats in Texas